Bill Oddie Back in the USA is a British television programme, about natural history, written and presented by Bill Oddie and screened in early 2007.

The formal description used by the BBC said:

Long before he became known as a wildlife presenter, Bill toured the states with fellow Cambridge graduates John Cleese and Tim Brooke-Taylor. Now, 43 years on he's touring the States again to check out the creatures there wasn't time to see the first time round.

The series' sound recordist, Chris Watson, occasionally appeared on-screen. The series producer was Nigel Pope.

Episodes

New York
First broadcast on 11 January

The series starts in New York City where Bill discovers a wealth of wildlife from bin-raiding raccoons to a pair of celebrity red-tailed hawks who live on fashionable 5th Avenue.

Florida
18 January

Bill heads south to visit the Sunshine State where he paddles a kayak through 'gator filled swampland, befriends an armadillo at the roadside and dons flippers and snorkel to share a magical moment with a family of manatees.

New England
25 January

Bill travels up the Eastern Seaboard, starting in Massachusetts with a surprisingly close encounter with humpback whales, before heading north to Maine's great wilderness in search of the elusive and beguiling moose.

Nebraska
30 January

While crossing the Great Plains of Nebraska and South Dakota, Bill witnesses one of the great wildlife spectacles – millions of migrating cranes.

Vancouver

6 February

Bill Oddie continues his wildlife tour of North America with a visit to the stunning scenery of Vancouver Island, where he gets a spectacular view of a family of killer whales and gets remarkably close to one of the continent's largest terrestrial predators, the grizzly bear.

Arizona
13 February

Bill dons a stetson as his wildlife tour of North America rolls west to Arizona for a showdown with venomous desert animals – wily coyotes, speedy road runners and a garden full of enchanting hummingbirds.

References

External links
 

2007 British television series debuts
2007 British television series endings
BBC television documentaries
English-language television shows
Television series about animals
Television shows set in Arizona
Television shows set in Florida
Television shows set in Massachusetts
Television shows set in Nebraska
Television shows set in New York (state)
Television shows set in Vancouver